"Everyday Is a Winding Road" is the second single from American singer and songwriter Sheryl Crow's 1996 eponymous album. Neil Finn, lead singer of Crowded House, provides backing vocals. Paul Hester, another member of Crowded House, was the inspiration for the song. The song was released in the United Kingdom in November 1996 and was released in the United States the following year.

The single was well-received on the radio and peaked at number 11 on the US Billboard Hot 100. It also peaked at number 12 on the UK Singles Chart and became Crow's fourth and final number-one single in Canada. The song earned a nomination for Record of the Year at the 1998 Grammy Awards but lost to "Sunny Came Home" by Shawn Colvin. A music video for this song was directed by Peggy Sirota and filmed in New York City in sepia. It features a toy airplane flying from person to person throughout the city.

Criticism
Greg Kot of the Chicago Tribune said the song "blatantly swipes" from the Rolling Stones' song "Sympathy for the Devil".

Track listings

US 7-inch single
A. "Everyday Is a Winding Road" (LP version) – 4:16
B. "Sad Sad World" – 4:05

US CD single
 "Everyday Is a Winding Road" (LP version) – 4:16
 "Sad Sad World" – 4:05
 "In Need" – 5:53
 "On the Outside" (live from Shepherd's Bush Empire) – 7:40

European CD single
 "Everyday Is a Winding Road" – 4:16
 "Free Man" – 3:20
 "Run Baby Run" (live at Woodstock) – 5:28
 "Ordinary Morning" – 3:55

UK CD1 (includes four postcards)
 "Everyday Is a Winding Road" (LP version) – 4:16
 "Strong Enough" (LP version) – 3:10
 "Can't Cry Anymore" (LP version) – 3:41
 "What I Can Do for You" (LP version) – 4:15

UK CD2
 "Everyday Is a Winding Road" (LP version) – 4:16
 "If It Makes You Happy" (Live BBC Simon Mayo Session) – 5:06
 "All I Wanna Do" (Live BBC Simon Mayo Session) – 4:30
 "Run Baby Run" (Live BBC Simon Mayo Session) – 5:53

Credits and personnel
Credits are lifted from the UK CD1 liner notes and the Sheryl Crow album booklet.

Studios
 Recorded at Kingsway Studios (New Orleans)
 Mastered at Gateway Mastering (Portland, Maine, US)

Personnel

 Sheryl Crow – writing, bass, Hammond organ, Harmonium, production
 Jeff Trott – writing, guitars
 Brian MacLeod – writing, loop
 Neil Finn – vocals
 Steve Donnelly – guitars

 Mitchell Froom – dueling Harmonium
 Michael Urbano – drums
 Trina Shoemaker – recording
 Tchad Blake – mixing
 Bob Ludwig – mastering

Charts

Weekly charts

Year-end charts

Release history

Covers
The song was covered by Prince on his 1999 album, Rave Un2 the Joy Fantastic. In addition, Prince made an appearance at the Toronto stop of the 1999 Lilith Fair festival tour to perform the song alongside Crow.

In popular culture
The song was featured in the films Erin Brockovich and Phenomenon. However, Phenomenon came out four months before the song's release and included a special edit of the song.

References

1996 singles
1996 songs
A&M Records singles
Prince (musician) songs
RPM Top Singles number-one singles
Sheryl Crow songs
Songs written by Brian MacLeod (U.S. musician)
Songs written by Jeff Trott
Songs written by Sheryl Crow